Samodiva Glacier is the 3.7 km long and 1.8 km wide glacier in the east part of Chavdar Peninsula in Graham Land on the Antarctic Peninsula.  Situated east of Tumba Ice Cap and west of Pirin Glacier.  Draining north-northeastwards east of Mount Pénaud to enter Curtiss Bay west of Seaplane Point.

The glacier is named after the settlement of Samodiva in southern Bulgaria.

Location
British mapping in 1978.

Maps
 British Antarctic Territory.  Scale 1:200000 topographic map No. 3198. DOS 610 - W 64 60.  Tolworth, UK, 1978.
 Antarctic Digital Database (ADD). Scale 1:250000 topographic map of Antarctica. Scientific Committee on Antarctic Research (SCAR). Since 1993, regularly upgraded and updated.

References
 Bulgarian Antarctic Gazetteer. Antarctic Place-names Commission. (details in Bulgarian, basic data in English)
 Samodiva Glacier. SCAR Composite Antarctic Gazetteer

External links
 Samodiva Glacier. Copernix satellite image

Bulgaria and the Antarctic
Glaciers of Davis Coast